The Kelton Apartments is a historic 4-unit 2-story multi-family building located at 644-648 Kelton Avenue, in the Westwood neighborhood of Los Angeles, California.

The building is a part of a collection of homes designed by Los Angeles based modernist architect, Richard Neutra, and built in North West Westwood Village, including the Strathmore Apartments, Elkay Apartments, and Landfair Apartments.

History 
The building was built in 1941 in the international style for Neutra's in-laws after they moved out of the nearby Strathmore Apartments. It is next door to the Elkay Apartments, which Neutra designed in 1948. The building is noted to be an indicator of Neutra's shifting post-war style towards a more "relaxed and lyrical" design. The building was featured on the cover of L'Architecture d'aujourd'hui in 1946.

On June 21, 1988, the City of Los Angeles designated the building as a Los Angeles Historic-Cultural Monument. The complex was listed on the National Register of Historic Places in 2020.

References

Los Angeles Historic-Cultural Monuments
International style architecture in California
Modernist architecture in California
Apartment buildings in Los Angeles
Richard Neutra buildings
Residential buildings completed in 1941
Westwood, Los Angeles
National Register of Historic Places in Los Angeles